Rhenium ditelluride is an inorganic compound of rhenium and tellurium with the formula ReTe2. Contrary to rhenium disulfide and diselenide, it does not have a layered structure.

References

Rhenium compounds
Tellurides
Transition metal dichalcogenides